Pyaara Dushman is a 1955 Bollywood film.

Soundtrack
"Aa Tujhko Bulaye Ye Pyasi Nigahe" - Asha Bhosle, Mohammed Rafi
"Ye Duniya Hai Aani Jani" - Asha Bhosle, Mohammed Rafi
"Ye Duniya Hai Aani Jani" - Asha Bhosle, Mohammed Rafi
"Mehanga Ho Ya Sasta Ho Par Sauda Kar Lo Pyar Ka" - Mohammed Rafi
"Dil Le Ke Dil Ki Duniya Mita Di" - Asha Bhosle
"Jine Wale Tu Agar Marne Se Darta" - Mohammed Rafi
"Pyaar Kiya Nahi Jata Ho Jata Hai" - Mohammed Rafi, Asha Bhosle

References

External links
 

1955 films
1950s Hindi-language films